This is a list of Polish television related events from 1998.

Events
Unknown - Debut of Zostań gwiazdą, a series hosted by Krzysztof Ibisz in which members of the public impersonate their favourite singers.
Unknown - The first series of Zostań gwiazdą is won by Magdalena Piwowarczyk performing as Sinéad O'Connor.

Debuts

Domestic
Unknown - Zostań gwiazdą (1998-1999)

International

Television shows

1990s
Klan (1997–present)

Ending this year

Births

Deaths